Mirko Eramo (born 12 July 1989) is an Italian professional football player currently playing as a midfielder for Ascoli.

Club career
On 31 January 2020, he signed a 2.5-year contract with Ascoli.

References

External links
 

1989 births
Sportspeople from the Metropolitan City of Bari
Footballers from Apulia
Living people
Italian footballers
Serie B players
Serie A players
S.S.C. Bari players
Piacenza Calcio 1919 players
A.C. Monza players
F.C. Crotone players
U.C. Sampdoria players
Empoli F.C. players
Ternana Calcio players
Trapani Calcio players
Benevento Calcio players
Virtus Entella players
Ascoli Calcio 1898 F.C. players
Association football midfielders